Humphrey Vincent Taylor (5 March 1938 – 17 February 2021) was an English Anglican clergyman who served as the sixth Suffragan Bishop of Selby.

Biography
He was educated at Twyford, Harrow and Pembroke College, Cambridge. After training for ordination at the College of the Resurrection, Mirfield, he was ordained deacon in 1963 and priest in 1964. He began his career with a curacy in Hammersmith and was then successively Rector of Lilongwe, Malaŵi, a chaplain at Bishop Grosseteste College in Lincoln, a Church administrator (firstly for the Synod; latterly for the USPG) before appointment to the Episcopate as Bishop suffragan of Selby — a post he held from 1991 until 2003. In retirement he continued to minister as an honorary assistant bishop in the Dioceses of Gloucester (2003–2013) and of Worcester, in which he had settled at Honeybourne, Worcestershire (2003–2016).

Taylor died in February 2021 at the age of 82, less than one month short of his 83rd birthday.

References

1938 births
2021 deaths
People educated at Twyford School
People educated at Harrow School
Alumni of Pembroke College, Cambridge
Alumni of the College of the Resurrection
Bishops of Selby
British expatriates in Malawi
20th-century Church of England bishops
21st-century Church of England bishops
People associated with Bishop Grosseteste University
Place of birth missing